Qubo was a children's TV channel operated by Ion Media.

Qubo may also refer to:

 Fiat Qubo, a 2007–present Italian compact MPV
 Quadratic unconstrained binary optimization (QUBO), a pattern matching technique

See also
 Qubo Saeed Khan, a city in Sindh province, Pakistan
 Qu Bo (disambiguation)
 Cubo (disambiguation)